Bärwald (transliterated Baerwald) may refer to:

 Alexander Baerwald (1877–1930) German-Jewish architect
 David Baerwald (born 1960), American musician
 Helmut Bärwald (1928–2003), German politician
 Richard Baerwald (1867–1929), German psychologist in Berlin
 Hermann Baerwald (1828–1907), German-Jewish historian, headmaster of Philanthropin School
 Hans Baerwald (1927–2010), Japanese-born German-American scholar
 Moritz Baerwald (1860-1919), German politician
 Paul Baerwald (1871–1961), Banker, philanthropist, Chairman/co-founder of Joint Distribution Committee
 Franz Berwald (1796–1868), Swedish-born Romantic composer
 Ernst Baerwald (1880–1952), German-Jewish businessman based in Japan, Director of Asia for IG Farben, OSS asset.

German-language surnames
Jewish surnames